Tango is a 1993 French comedy film directed by Patrice Leconte.

Cast 
 Philippe Noiret - L'Elégant
 Richard Bohringer - Vincent Baraduc
 Thierry Lhermitte - Paul
 Carole Bouquet - Female Guest
 Jean Rochefort - Bellhop
 Miou-Miou - Marie
 Judith Godrèche - Madeleine
 Michèle Laroque - Hélène Baraduc
 Maxime Leroux - Mariano Escobar
 Jean Benguigui - Lefort
 Ticky Holgado - Waiter
 Laurent Gamelon - Taxi Driver
 Jacques Mathou - Truck Driver
 Élodie Bouchez - Girl in Aeroplane

References

External links 

1993 comedy films
1993 films
French comedy films
Films directed by Patrice Leconte
1990s French films